KCAX Branson4u.com is a radio station airing a classic hits format licensed to Branson, Missouri, broadcasting on 1220 kHz AM. The station is owned by Mike Huckabee, through licensee Ozark Mountain Media Group, LLC. DBA as Ozarks Dynacom. Branson4u is about serving listeners, and local vendors as well as educating visitors about all Branson has to offer.

History
On October 1, 2016, KOMC dropped its gospel format and began stunting with Christmas music (the first station in the U.S. to do so) under the new KCAX calls. On January 1, 2017, KCAX began a format broadcasting Classic Country to the Branson area.

On July 3, 2017, KCAX changed their format from classic country to classic hits, swapping formats with KRZK 106.3 FM Branson.

Previous logo

References

External links
KCAX 98.1 & 1220 Facebook

CAX
Radio stations established in 1965
1965 establishments in Missouri
Branson, Missouri
Classic hits radio stations in the United States